WISEA 1101+5400 (full name WISEA J110125.95+540052.8) is a T-type brown dwarf (specifically T5.5) approximately 100 light-years away in the constellation Ursa Major. It was discovered in March 2017 by members of the citizen science project Backyard Worlds. Initial photometric analysis suggested it was a T5.5 dwarf, which was later confirmed by a spectrum of the object obtained with the NASA Infrared Telescope Facility. It is the first confirmed brown dwarf found by the project.

The brown dwarf was identified by several volunteers, including the therapist Rosa Castro, Bob Fletcher, Khasan Mokaev and Tamara Stajic. WISEA 1101+5400 was discovered six days after the launch of the project and the discovery was the fastest publication for any Zooniverse project at the time of the publication.

The discovery of this brown dwarf allowed the backyard worlds collaboration to estimate the amount of new brown dwarfs the project could discover. This was allowed due to the fact that the brown dwarf is one magnitude fainter than any brown dwarf previously discovered with proper motion surveys. The team estimated that the project would discover  new L-dwarfs,  T-dwarfs and  Y-dwarfs. As of July 2019 the project did meet this estimate with spectroscopically confirmed T- and L-dwarfs (70 T-dwarfs and 61 L-dwarfs), but exceeded this estimate by brown dwarf candidates (1305).

External links
WISEA 1101+5400 on wiseview, a tool created by Backyard Worlds volunteers
Subject 5566284 Zooniverse subject
New Brown Dwarf Found by NASA-funded Citizen Science Project Goddard Media Studios (GSFC)
Citizen Scientists Uncover Cold New World Near the Sun story by AMNH

References

Brown dwarfs
T-type stars
20170306
Ursa Major (constellation)
WISE objects